Ranunculus fluitans (the river water-crowfoot,) is a species of buttercup. It is a perennial water plant, which when in favourable conditions (such as fast flowing water,) can grow up to 6 m (20 ft) height.

Description
Ranunculus fluitans has no floating leaves, instead it has long and narrow, tassel-like segments. Reaching up to 30 cm (12 in) long. The long, slender stems can have up to two flower stems. The white flowers are held above the water level, they are around 2–3 cm across. They are daisy-like, with 6–8 overlapping petals around a central yellow area. It blooms in June, then the rounded seed heads become hairless fruits.
It is similar in form to Ranunculus trichophyllus (thread-leaved water-crowfoot), principal differences being flower petal number- thread-leaved has only 5 petals and shorter leaves- and different preferred habitat- thread-leaved prefers slower flowing waters.

Taxonomy
It was formally described by the French naturalist and botanist Jean-Baptiste Lamarck in his book 'Flore françoise' Vol.3 on page 184 in 1779.

The species epithet fluitans is Latin for floating.

Distribution
It is endemic to western Europe.

Range
It can be found in North Macedonia, Ireland, the United Kingdom, southern Sweden, France, Germany, Poland, Switzerland, Austria, the Czech Republic, Slovenia, Slovakia, Hungary and Italy.
It grows in fast flowing waters of the UK, within England, Scotland and Wales.

Ecology

A Ranunculus fluitans community or Ranunculion fluitantis, defines a British plant community comprising stands of submerged vegetation dominated by clumps of Crowfoot.
It is thought to be Vulnerable in Sweden and Near Threatened in Switzerland, but elsewhere it is widespread and abundant.

Culture

William Barnes (1801–1886) an English writer, poet and Church of England priest, referred to the plant in his poem 'The Water Crowfoot'. 
O small feac'd flow'r that now dost bloom
To stud wi'white the shallow Frome,
An' leave the clote to spread his flow'r
On darksome pools o' stwoneless Stour.
This refers to the River Frome's being at danger from man's interference.

References

External links
 
 

fluitans
Flora of Europe
Flora of the United Kingdom
Flora of Sweden
Flora of Germany
Flora of Poland
Flora of Switzerland
Flora of Austria
Flora of the Czech Republic
Flora of Slovenia
Flora of Slovakia
Flora of Hungary
Flora of Italy
Least concern plants
Plants described in 1779